Doreen McKay was an American film actress. She starred opposite John Wayne in the 1938 film Pals of the Saddle and the 1939 film The Night Riders.

Filmography
 Star for a Night (1936)
 The Higgins Family (1938)
 Pals of the Saddle (1938)
 The Night Riders (1939)
 Eternally Yours (1939)

References

External links

Year of birth missing
Year of death missing
American film actresses
20th-century American actresses
Western (genre) film actresses